The 2017–18 Egypt Cup was the 86th edition of the oldest recognised football tournament in Africa. It was sponsored by Telecom Egypt, and known as the Telecom Egypt Cup for sponsorship purposes. 286 clubs were accepted into the tournament. It began with the first qualifying round on 23 September 2017, and concluded with the final on 15 May 2018. The winner qualifies for the 2018–19 CAF Confederation Cup.

Egyptian Premier League side Al Ahly were the defending champions, but they were eliminated by Al Assiouty Sport in the quarter-finals on 30 April 2018.

Zamalek won their 26th title after defeating Smouha 5–4 on penalties in the final, after the match ended 1–1 after extra time, winning their 5th Egypt Cup in 6 seasons.

Teams

Round and draw dates
The schedule is as follows.

Qualifying rounds

All of the competing teams that are not members of the Egyptian Premier League had to compete in the qualifying rounds to secure one of 14 available places in the Round of 32. The qualifying competition began with the first qualifying round on 23 September 2017. The final (fifth) qualifying round was played on 27 and 28 October 2017.

Round of 32
A total of 32 clubs played in this round; 14 winners of the fifth qualifying round, and 18 teams from the Premier League entering in this round. The draw was held on 1 November 2017 at the EFA headquarters in Gezira, Cairo. The matches were played from 7 to 11 November 2017. The round included one team from Level 3 still in the competition, Asyut Petroleum, who were the lowest-ranked team in this round.

All times are CAT (UTC+2).

Round of 16
A total of 16 clubs played in this round; all winners of the previous round. The draw was held on 1 November 2017 at the EFA headquarters in Gezira, Cairo. The matches were played from 7 December 2017 to 13 April 2018. The round included three teams from Level 2 still in the competition, FC Masr, El Gouna and Haras El Hodoud, who were the lowest-ranked team in this round.

All times are CAT (UTC+2).

Quarter-finals
A total of 8 clubs played in this round; all winners of the previous round. The draw was held on 1 November 2017 at the EFA headquarters in Gezira, Cairo. The matches were played from 14 April 2018 to 2 May 2018.

All times are CAT (UTC+2).

Semi-finals
A total of 4 clubs played in this round; all winners of the previous round. The draw was held on 1 November 2017 at the EFA headquarters in Gezira, Cairo. The matches were played on 7 and 8 May 2018.

All times are CAT (UTC+2).

Final

Bracket
The following is the bracket which the Egypt Cup resembled. Numbers in parentheses next to the match score represent the results of a penalty shoot-out.

References

 
Egypt Cup
Egypt Cup